Syria competed at the 1996 Summer Olympics in Atlanta, United States.  Ghada Shouaa won the nation's first ever gold medal.

Medalists

Athletics

Women
Combined events – Heptathlon

Boxing

Men

Swimming

Men

Weightlifting

Men

Wrestling

Men's freestyle

Men's Greco-Roman

References
Official Olympic Reports
International Olympic Committee results database

Notes

Nations at the 1996 Summer Olympics
1996
Olympics, Summer